Suzy Kolber (born ) is an American football sideline reporter, co-producer, and sportscaster for ESPN. She was one of the original anchors of ESPN2 when it launched in 1993. Three years later, she left ESPN2 to join Fox Sports, and rejoined ESPN in late 1999.

Biography

Early life
Kolber was raised in a Jewish family in suburban Philadelphia, Pennsylvania. She went to Sandy Run Middle School in Dresher, Pennsylvania, and is a 1982 graduate of Pennsylvania's Upper Dublin High School. She graduated from the University of Miami in 1986. At ten years old, Suzy won a spot on the school football team. However, she quit because of a strong disagreement from adults and her parents.

Career before ESPN
Kolber graduated from the University of Miami in 1986 with a Bachelor of Arts degree in telecommunications.  While an undergraduate, she worked at Dynamic Cable in Coral Gables, Florida, as a sports director (1984–86) and was on the University of Miami water ski team.  After graduation, she worked at CBS Sports in New York City as a videotape coordinator (1986).

From 1985 to 1989, Kolber produced the 5:30 p.m. ET sportscast at WTVJ-TV in Miami, winning a local Sports Emmy in 1988. From 1989 to 1990, she freelanced as a specials producer for WPLG-TV in Miami. In addition, she produced two magazine shows, Greyhound Racing America in Miami, Florida (1988–90) and Cowboys Special Edition in Irving, Texas (1990–91). In 1991, Kolber's freelance assignments included work as a reporter/producer for Breeders' Cup Newsfeed in Greenwich, Connecticut; a field producer for Inside Edition in New York City; a sports specials producer for WCIX-TV in Miami, and a producer/director for NFL Films. She was a weekend sports anchor and weekday feature reporter at WPEC-TV in West Palm Beach, Florida from December 1991 until she moved to ESPN in 1993.

ESPN
Kolber has covered a variety of assignments for ESPN from the National Football League to the 1996 ESPN X Games bicycle-stunt events and Grand Slam tennis events.  She is most recognized as a sideline reporter on ESPN’s Monday Night Football with Michele Tafoya. In 2007, she was also a host for ESPN’s pre-race NASCAR Countdown program.

Kolber joined ESPN’s MNF team during its inaugural year in 2006 after five previous seasons on ESPN's Sunday Night Football (2001–05). As a member of the MNF team, Kolber helped the longtime franchise become the most-watched program in cable television history.

Kolber worked the ABC Sports broadcast of Super Bowl XL in Detroit in 2006 with Michele Tafoya and contributed to the network’s pre-game show.  She also became the first female recipient of the Maxwell Club Sports Broadcaster of the Year Award in 2006 and was named to Sports Business Daily’s 2004 list of the 10 favorite sports TV personalities of the past 10 years.
Kolber regularly hosts ESPN’s year-round NFL Live news and information show, and she has played a major role in ESPN’s comprehensive coverage of the annual NFL Draft, hosting the Day 2 telecast (2004–2006) and leading analysis segments on Day 1. For the 1999 through 2003 NFL seasons, Kolber was the host of NFL Matchup. She also previously contributed “Backstage” segments to Monday Night Countdown.

During the NFL off-season, Kolber serves as an anchor on SportsCenter and as an on-site and studio host for ESPN's tennis coverage at the French Open (since 2004–2006) and Wimbledon (since 2003–2006/2009). In 1996, 2000 and 2001, she hosted the Summer X Games and Winter X Games, and she co-hosted the event again in Aspen in 2006. She also hosted horse racing events including all three legs of the Triple Crown for ESPN/ESPN2 studio programs.

Kolber returned to ESPN in August 1999 after originally joining the network in 1993 as co-host for ESPN2's SportsNight, when the network debuted October 1 of that year. She later served as an anchor on SportsCenter, a reporter on College GameDay and co-host of the X Games in 1995 and 1996. Kolber also hosted ESPN2's SportsFigures, which uses sports celebrities and analogies to teach math and physics.

While covering the 2011 NFL Draft, Kolber came under fire for her interview with Mark Ingram II, who started to sob when Kolber read an e-mail from Ingram's imprisoned father. The interview was perceived by some as being manipulative.

On Tuesday, September 13, 2011, the ESPN2 debut of the show NFL32 with Suzy Kolber and Chris Mortensen hit the air. With a backdrop similar to a sports bar (complete with wainscoting, sports memorabilia, and dark woodwork), the show focuses on "dissect the biggest topics of the day from all 32 NFL teams" and attributes much of its design to that of the Dan Patrick Show, a well listened to and watched national radio and television show on DirecTV's Audience network.

The Namath incident
On December 20, 2003, Kolber received national attention when, covering a New York Jets game, former Jets quarterback Joe Namath twice stated, in a nationally televised sideline interview with Kolber, that he wanted to kiss her, and "couldn't care less about the team strugg-a-ling." Kolber responded, "Thanks, Joe. I'll take that as a huge compliment."  Namath later apologized and blamed the incident on his obvious intoxication. Soon after, Namath entered an outpatient alcoholism treatment program. Namath chronicled the episode, including his battle with alcoholism in his book Namath and later said that remembering the embarrassment he felt after the interview aired helped him maintain a lasting sobriety.

Monday Night Football
Kolber joined ESPN's Monday Night Football crew as a sideline reporter along with Michele Tafoya when the network took over the longtime football series from ABC Sports in 2006. After Tafoya left ESPN for NBC Sports at the end of the 2010–2011 NFL season, ESPN used a rotating solo sideline reporter for the 2011–2012 NFL season, with reporters such as Wendi Nix, Ed Werder and Rachel Nichols stepping into the role each week, with Kolber as a fill-in. Kolber requested to do more in-studio work so she didn't have to be away from her child. The show NFL32 (now NFL Insiders) was created as a result of this request. Lisa Salters was named the new full-time solo sideline reporter for Monday Night Football starting with the 2012–2013 NFL season, effectively ending Kolber's tenure as sideline reporter for the show, although both Salters and Kolber continue to co-produce the show in some capacity.

NASCAR Countdown
In the two weeks prior to Kolber's arrival in 2007, Brent Musburger was mysteriously absent from his position as lead host of NASCAR Countdown on the ABC/ESPN network. On the week of the race on May 19, ESPN gave no reason for his absence but announced Kolber as the new host of Nextel Cup and Busch Series studio programming. She was subsequently replaced by Allen Bestwick as host of NASCAR Countdown.

Monday Night Countdown
After substituting for the then-ailing Stuart Scott during most of the 2014 NFL season, Kolber took over Scott's role permanently as an on-site host of Monday Night Countdown, starting with the 2015 NFL season, after Scott died on January 4, 2015.

Fox Sports
Kolber left ESPN for Fox Sports in November 1996, where she anchored Fox Sports News for the fledgling Fox Sports Net and reported from NFL games, among other duties. She served as the lead reporter for the network's coverage of the NFL on Fox teaming up with the network's No. 1 announcer team of Pat Summerall and John Madden for one game in 1998. She also covered horse racing. She served as studio host for the network's coverage of the NHL on Fox, including both the 1999 Stanley Cup Finals and the Playoffs. In March 1999, Kolber co-hosted a Fox non-sports presentation with Maury Povich, Opening the Lost Tombs: Live From Egypt, an archaeological event that promised to "unveil five-thousand year old mysteries."  Fox's TV cameras showed the first live excavation on Egypt's ancient Giza plateau; Kolber reported live from the tomb. She returned to ESPN in August 1999.

Endorsements
Kolber's football broadcast narrative is featured on Sega's video game, ESPN NFL Football for Microsoft's Xbox and Sony's PlayStation 2.

Kolber also is a national television spokesperson for Chevrolet and Pepsi-Cola commercials.

In 1995's ESPN Extreme Games for PlayStation, she has multiple video sequences hyping up the player, introducing levels, and hinting at secret areas. The re-release of the game, 1Xtreme, removed all of her videos, and any reference to ESPN.

References

External links

Official biography at ESPN.com

American television sports announcers
American television sports anchors
American television reporters and correspondents
ESPN people
National Football League announcers
National Hockey League broadcasters
Television personalities from Philadelphia
University of Miami alumni
Women sports announcers
Tennis commentators
Motorsport announcers
American horse racing announcers
College football announcers
Living people
People from Upper Dublin Township, Pennsylvania
Jewish American sportspeople
American women television journalists
Year of birth missing (living people)